RTR-Planeta is the international service of VGTRK, a state-owned broadcaster in Russia. It is available throughout the world via cable and satellite.

Broadcasting
RTR Planeta is the only provider of Russian-language programming to the Asia-Pacific region covered by the AsiaSat 2 Satellite. To step up the accessibility of its content to viewers RTR Planeta has eagerly embraced new technologies launching in various IPTV, ADSL and other advanced networks.

In October 2009 a separate version of the TV channel to broadcast via the Eutelsat 36A satellite to Ukrainian TV viewers was especially created. This was done because on November 1, 2008 the Ukrainian Television and Radio Broadcasting Council demanded that (Ukrainian) cable operators remove Russian TV channels that did not adopt the Ukrainian legislation from their broadcasting lists. The decision affected, in particular, RTR-Planeta, Channel One and TV Center.

On May 1, 2010, RTR Planeta returned to the Ukrainian cable networks.

Bans
: In April 2015 RTR Planeta's broadcasts were blocked for three months by Lithuania because of transmitting ‘propagation of violence and instigation of war’. Lithuania's Radio and Television Commission gave the explanation that RTR Planeta was portraying Ukrainian people as enemies of Russia and showing contempt for Ukraine’s territorial integrity.
: On January 31, 2019 RTR Planeta's broadcasts were blocked for three months in Latvia because of transmitting "propaganda and hate speeches, that were considered encouraging violence". Some of the hate speeches encouraged viewers to hang Ukrainians over their political views. This was the second time the channel received a ban in Latvia, the previous time being in 2016, when the channel was accused of spreading false information.
: At the end of April 2022 the EU Commission announced, that there will be sanctions against Russian TV channels, broadcasting to Europe via Satellite and Rebroadcasting as a consequence of the Russian invasion of Ukraine. According to politico.eu, Rossiya RTR/RTR Planeta, Rossiya 24 and TV Centre International will be sanctioned in an effort to curtail Russian propaganda.

Logos

References

External links

Mass media companies of Russia
Television networks in Russia
International broadcasters
Russian-language television stations
Television channels and stations established in 2002
2002 establishments in Russia
Companies based in Moscow